Laure Coutan-Montorgueil (1855-1915) was a French sculptor.

Biography
Coutan-Montorgueil née Martin was born in 1855 in Dun-sur-Auron. She studied with Alfred Boucher. Coutan-Montorgueil exhibited her work in the Woman's Building at the 1893 World's Columbian Exposition in Chicago, Illinois. She died in 1915.

Gallery

References

External links
 

1855 births
1915 deaths
19th-century French women artists
20th-century French women artists
19th-century French sculptors
20th-century French sculptors